Quiver Township is located in Mason County, Illinois, United States. As of the 2010 census, its population was 900 and it contained 517 housing units.

Quiver Township took its name from Quiver Creek.

Geography

Demographics

References

External links
City-data.com
Illinois State Archives

Townships in Mason County, Illinois
Townships in Illinois